Anton Lui (born July 27, 1985 in Rabaul, East New Britain) is a sprinter from Papua New Guinea.

Achievements

References

External links
 

1985 births
Living people
Papua New Guinean male sprinters
Athletes (track and field) at the 2006 Commonwealth Games
Commonwealth Games competitors for Papua New Guinea
People from East New Britain Province